The Qinling–Huaihe Line is a reference line used by geographers to distinguish between northern and southern China, corresponding roughly to the 33rd parallel. Qinling refers to the Qin Mountains, and Huaihe refers to the Huai River. Running from Qin Mountain in the west to Huai River in the east, it divides eastern China into northern and southern regions that differ from each other in climate, culture, lifestyle, and cuisine. 

Regions north of the Line tend to be temperate or continental, with snow being a regular feature in winter. Regions south of the Line tend to be subtropical or tropical. In general, the southern region is hotter, wetter, and much more hilly than the northern region.

History 
The line has served as the border between northern and southern Chinese dynasties: between the Northern and Southern dynasties of c. 3th–6th century and between the Southern Song of c. 13th century and its northern neighbor Jin dynasty.

Historically, due to being the Cradle of Chinese Civilization, the North had been more developed than the South. That has changed over time and three of the four most developed Tier 1 cities in China are in the South. It was in the Ming dynasty that the economy of the South started to outpace the economy of the North. The gross regional product (GRP) of provinces and counties below the line was equal to those above the line in 1960, but by 2019, the south's GRP had become 83% larger than the north's.

The Qinling–Huaihe Line was defined by Chinese geographer Zhang Xiangwen in 1908, defining north China as anything above a line running along the Qinling Mountains in the west and the Huai River the east.

In the 1950s, Premier Zhou Enlai used the line to create a subsidized district heating system only in the colder north, a system still in effect today.  This has led to the north suffering from heavy air pollution due to coal heating plants, while the south suffers from lack of heating during the winter months.

Nearby features 

The line is attributed with serving as a division line in the hydrology and climatology of China. It roughly coincides with:
 the  annual precipitation line (isohyet) of China; by extension, the division between China's humid and semi-humid areas and rice or wheat production areas;
 the  average January temperature (isotherm) line of China; by extension, China's subtropic zone;
 the division between the drainage basins of the Yangtze and Yellow Rivers.

See also 
 Heihe–Tengchong Line, divides China in eastern and western halves
 Mason–Dixon line, North American counterpart

References 

Cartography
Cultural boundaries
Northern China
South China